RCUV may refer to:
 Regional Council of Unrecognized Villages, a democratic representative body for the residents of the Bedouin unrecognized villages of the Negev Desert
 Revised Chinese Union Version, an updated Chinese translation of the Bible